Ssuk Islet (쑥섬 "mugwort island") is a small island in the Taedong River in Pyongyang, North Korea, separated by a shallow channel from the larger Turu Island to its west. Since 1983 it has been accessible by road via an off-ramp in the middle of the Chungsong Bridge. It is the site of the new Pyongyang Sci-Tech Complex completed in 2015.

Ssuk Islet is listed as a Revolutionary Site, commemorating a 1948 meeting between North and South Korean organizations.

References

Islands of North Korea
Geography of Pyongyang
Historic sites in North Korea